Neutral Detector (ND) is a detector for particle physics experiments created  by the team of physicists in the 
Budker Institute of Nuclear Physics, Novosibirsk, Russia.
Experiments with the ND were conducted from 1982 to 1987 at the e+e− storage ring   VEPP-2M in the energy range 2E=0.5-1.4 GeV.

Physics 

At the beginning of 80s the leading cross sections of the electron-positron annihilation in the final states with charged particles were measured in the energy range 2E=0.5-1.4 GeV. Processes with the neutral particles in the final state were less studied.

was constructed. Its distinguishing features are defined by the specially designed electromagnetic calorimeter based on NaI(Tl) scintillation counters.

List of published analyses 

 Radiative decays
  
  

  
  

 Search for rare decays
  
  
  

 Non-resonant electron-positron annihilation into hadrons
  
  
  

 Test of QED processes 
 
 
 
    (virtual Compton scattering) 

 Analyses of other processes
Measurement of the ω-meson parameters 
 
Search for

Detector 

Based on goals of the physics program the ND consist of

Electromagnetic calorimeter
 168 rectangular NaI(Tl) scintillation counters
 total mass of NaI(Tl) is 2.6 t
 solid angle coverage is 65% of 4π sr
 minimum thickness is 32 cm or 12 radiation length
 energy resolution for photons is σ/E = 4% / 

Charged particle coordinate system
 3 layers of coaxial cylindrical 2-d wire proportional chambers in the center of the detector
 solid angle coverage is 80% of 4π sr
 angular resolution is 0.5° in the azimuthal and 1.5° in the polar direction
 surrounded by the 5-mm thick plastic scintillation counter for trigger

Flat (shower) coordinate 2-d wire proportional chambers
 2 layers of flat 2-d wire proportional chambers.
 angular resolution is 2° in the azimuthal and 3.5° in the polar direction for 0.5 GeV photons

Iron absorber & anti-coincidence counters
 The electromagnetic calorimeter is covered by the 10-cm thick iron absorber and plastic scintillation anti-coincidence counters.

Results 
Data collected with the ND experiment corresponds to the integrated luminosity 19 pb−1.
Results of the experiments with ND are presented in Ref.,
and are included in the PDG Review.

See also 
 SND Experiment
 Particle detector
 Experimental physics
 List of accelerators in particle physics
 Budker Institute of Nuclear Physics
 Storage ring
 Meson
 List of particles
 Annihilation

References

External links 
 Budker Institute of Nuclear Physics (BINP)
 VEPP-2M
 NOVOSIBIRSK-ND experiment record on INSPIRE-HEP

Particle detectors
Particle experiments
Experimental particle physics
Particle physics facilities
Budker Institute of Nuclear Physics